Furrer v Snelling (1220) 38 Michalmass 13 Jac B R Dyer, 55 is a very early contracts and property case, in English law. The case established the ratio that in covenant only damages are recoverable.

A tenant entered a covenant for payment of rent of £20 per annum, for 4½ years. However, the case was brought for non-payment of £100 which the plaintiff claimed for the rent.

The judge found that "in covenant damages only are to be recovered and this surplus in miscomputing shall be abated", and "where more is demanded than is due... the debt only, is to be recovered".

References

English contract case law
1220s in law
1220 in England